Linna Huynh (born 1 January 1991) is a Canadian television presenter, actress and model currently based in Hong Kong under contract with TVB.

Early life
Huynh was born and raised in Vancouver with fifty-percent Vietnamese ancestry.  She is the second of four sisters. She started to model while attending high school, gaining experience with bridal, fashion and makeup modelling before entering a local modelling competition in 2010.

Career
Huynh was the lead female actress in the Vancouver-based, Asian-styled action movie Beyond Redemption.

She is currently a TV host at TVB, hosting Think Big (天地), a children's game show, as well as lifestyle programme Dolce Vita,  home interior design programme 安樂蝸 Own Sweet Home, and Big Big Beauty 今期流行, in addition to TVBi Entertainment News show 1周八爪娛. Having limited skills speaking Cantonese, or reading and writing Chinese, Huynh has been assigned to working in variety programmes to further improve her Chinese before she is able to be considered for dramas.

Linna was in the 28th Artiste Training Class hosted by TVB.

References

External links

1991 births
Living people
Actresses from British Columbia
Canadian actresses of Hong Kong descent
Canadian emigrants to Hong Kong
Canadian film actresses
Canadian people of Vietnamese descent
Hong Kong people of Vietnamese descent
Hong Kong television presenters
Hong Kong women television presenters
Canadian-born Hong Kong artists